Theta Aquilae (θ Aql, θ Aquilae) is a binary star in the constellation Aquila. The combined apparent visual magnitude of the pair is 3.26, making it the fourth-brightest member of the constellation. In Chinese, it has the traditional name Tseen Foo , from the Chinese 天桴 (Mandarin pronunciation tiānfú), which could mean "heavenly raft" or "heavenly ridgepole"; it might also mean "heavenly drumsticks", with Altair, Beta Aquilae and Gamma Aquilae being the drum.

Properties
Theta Aquilae is a double-lined spectroscopic binary, which indicates that the individual components have not been viewed through a telescope; instead, what can be viewed is their combined spectrum with the individual absorption line features shifting back and forth over the course of an orbit because of the Doppler effect. Their orbit has a period of 17.1 days with a large orbital eccentricity is 0.60. At the estimated distance of this system, the angular separation of 3.2 milliarcseconds corresponds to a physical separation of only about 0.24–0.28 astronomical units.

Both stars have a matching stellar classification of B9.5 III, indicating that they are massive, B-type giant stars that have exhausted the supply of hydrogen at their cores and evolved away from the main sequence of stars like the Sun. Hummel et al. (1996) gave the primary component, θ Aql A, an estimated mass of 3.6 solar, a radius 4.8 the Sun's, and 278 the luminosity of the Sun. For the secondary component, θ Aql B, they give the corresponding parameters as 2.9 times the mass, 2.4 times the radius and 68 times the luminosity of the Sun. Based upon their estimated parameters, Kaler (2008) suggests that θ Aql A is actually a subgiant star, while θ Aql B is a main sequence star.

Etymology

In the catalogue of stars in the Calendarium of Al Achsasi al Mouakket, this star was designated Thanih Ras al Akab (تاني ألرأس ألعقاب - taanii al ra’s alʕuqāb), which was translated into Latin as Secunda Capitis Vulturis, meaning the second (star) of eagle's head.

This star, along with δ Aql and η Aql, were Al Mizān (ألميزان), the Scale-beam. According to the catalogue of stars in the Technical Memorandum 33-507 - A Reduced Star Catalog Containing 537 Named Stars, Al Mizān were the title for three stars :δ Aql as Al Mizān I, η Aql as Al Mizān II and θ Aql as Al Mizān III.

This star, together with η Aql, δ Aql, ι Aql, κ Aql and λ Aql, constituted the obsolete constellation Antinous.

References

External links
 Image Theta Aquilae
 The Constellations and Named Stars

Aquila (constellation)
B-type giants
Spectroscopic binaries
Al Mizān III
Aquilae, Theta
7710
191692
099473
BD-01 3911
Aquilae, 65